Snare most often refers to:
 Snare drum
 Snare trap, a kind of trap used for capturing animals

Snare may also refer to:

Art and entertainment
 Snare, a science fiction novel by Katharine Kerr
 Snare, a Decepticon in the Transformers universe
 The Snare, a 1918 British silent film

Medicine
 SNARE (protein), a family of proteins involved in vesicle fusion
Snare technique (surgery), a technique used for surgical extraction and cauterization
 Vascular snare, a surgical device

People
 C. J. Snare, a rock and roll singer
 Joanne Snare, American laser scientist
 Todd Snare, a drummer

Other uses
 Snare (software), a group of security tools for logging computer activity
 The Snares, a group of islands approximately 200 kilometres south of New Zealand
 Snares penguin, a bird indigenous to the islands